The women's team pursuit race of the 2014–15 ISU Speed Skating World Cup 4, arranged in the Thialf arena in Heerenveen, Netherlands, was held on 13 December 2014.

The Dutch team won the race, while the German team came second, and the Polish team came third.

Results
The race took place on Saturday, 13 December, in the afternoon session, scheduled at 16:33.

References

Women team pursuit
4